Saint-Martin-du-Vivier is a commune in the Seine-Maritime department in the Normandy region in northern France.

Geography
SNCF operates a TER railway service here.

Heraldry

Population

Places of interest
 The church of St. Martin, dating from the nineteenth century.
 An ancient cedar tree, said to be over 200 years old.
 The eighteenth-century manorhouse at Mesnil-Grémichon.
 The chateau and chapel of Mont-Perreux.

See also
Communes of the Seine-Maritime department

References

Communes of Seine-Maritime